Katherine Dawn (1896-1984) (born Katherine Virginia Madden, and sometimes credited as Susan Denis) was an American actress, screenwriter, and editor active during the 1920s through the 1940s. She was married to director Norman Dawn, who she met when she was working as a scenarist at Universal Pictures.

Selected filmography 
As actress:

 Showgirl's Luck (1931)
 Black Hills (1929)
 Black Cargoes of the South Seas (1929)
 For the Term of His Natural Life (1927)
 Typhoon Love (1926)
 Justice of the Far North (1925)
 Lure of the Yukon (1924)

As screenwriter:

 Orphans of the North (1940)
 Taku (1937)

As editor:

 For the Term of His Natural Life (1927)

References

External links

1896 births
1984 deaths
20th-century American actresses
American film actresses
American film editors
American women screenwriters
American women film editors
20th-century American women writers
20th-century American screenwriters